The Nag missile (IAST: Nāga; en: Cobra), also called "Prospina" for the land-attack version, is an Indian third-generation, all-weather, fire-and-forget, lock-on after launch, anti-tank guided missile (ATGM) with an operational range of 500m to 20km depending on variant. It has a single-shot hit probability of 90% and a ten-year, maintenance-free shelf life. The Nag has five variants under development: a land version, for a mast-mounted system; the helicopter-launched Nag (HELINA) also known as Dhruvastra; a "man-portable" version (MPATGM); an air-launched version which will replace the current imaging infra-red (IIR) to millimetric-wave (mmW) active radar homing seeker; and the Nag Missile Carrier (NAMICA) "tank buster", which is a modified BMP-2 infantry fighting vehicle (IFV) produced under license in India by Ordnance Factory Medak (OFMK).

Development of the Nag is part of the Integrated Guided Missile Development Program (IGMDP), run by Defence Research and Development Organisation (DRDO). It is manufactured by Bharat Dynamics Limited (BDL). India's Ministry of Defence (MoD) announced on 19 July 2019 that the missile was ready for production. The Defence Research and Development Organization (DRDO) successfully completed the final trial of Nag anti-tank missile using a live warhead on a dud tank at Pokhran army ranges at 6.45 am on 21 Oct 2020.

Development and testing

Development of the Nag missile began in 1988 under A. P. J. Abdul Kalam. The first tests were conducted in November 1990. Development was delayed for several years because of issues with the IIR-based guidance system. The Nag missile underwent successful tests in September 1997 and January 2000. In 2000, MoD announced that the Nag was likely to enter full-scale production in early 2001.

The Nag was successfully test-fired for two consecutive days in August 2008, from the test range at Pokhran, Rajasthan, marking the completion of developmental tests. The DRDO and the Indian Army planned to conduct user trials shortly thereafter. These would be the final trials to decide whether the system would go into production. The NAMICA successfully completed amphibious trials in the Indira Gandhi Canal at Rajasthan on 8 August 2008.

In 2008, the Indian Army placed an order for 443 Nag missiles and 13 NAMICA carriers to be delivered within the next three years, starting by December 2009. Nag would be the first ATGM of its type to be included in the army's arsenal. The Army urgently needed the Nag, which uses a tandem-charge high-explosive anti-tank shaped charge warhead to penetrate the armor of modern tanks, to improve kill probability. By 2008, the development cost had reached .

During the user trials, the Nag missile was tested successfully by the Indian Army on 26 December 2008. The Indian Army was also extremely satisfied with the performance of the warhead of the missile. Another successful test was conducted on 28 December 2008. A total of five missiles were fired during day and night against stationary and moving targets. Before the induction of the missile into service, summer trials were carried out in June 2009. In July 2009, the Nag ATGM was cleared for production.

The trials were conducted using an advanced-imaging infrared-seeker head, per the Army's requirements. Another tank was engaged and destroyed at a range of over 4 km in a test of the missile's fire-and-forget capability, using the day version of the IIR passive seeker. In its IIR form, the Nag has limited all-weather capability. This limitation has provided added impetus to development of the mmW active seeker. Efforts were undertaken to provide special embedded on-board hunters that could hunt for targets using 'day seekers' and 'day-&-night seekers'. During trials in June 2010, the short-range capability of the missile to hit targets was validated. The Nag missile hit a target at a range of half a kilometer in just three seconds. In the follow-on test, a moving target was hit within 3.2 seconds after launch. The final user trials were held during July 2010 and successfully completed. The missile was cleared for mass production. BDL planned to produce 100 Nag missiles annually to replace the existing Konkours and MILAN second-generation missiles in the arsenal. The Nag was test-fired as part of user validation trials on 16 July 2010.

The Nag successfully completed its final validation trials and was expected to join the Indian Army's arsenal in 2011. Two missiles were launched simultaneously against a moving target, and another two missiles were launched against a stationary Vijayanta tank in quick succession, and all successfully hit the targets. In 2011, the project suffered a one-year delay due to the army's changing of its requirements for the NAMICA at the last moment.

Missile tests during the summer of 2011 in Rajasthan failed to achieve its objective of hitting the target at the intended 4-km range. The scientists found a fault in the heat-seeker: it was unable to distinguish between the heat signature of the target and its surroundings during high temperatures at long distances. This led to the development of a better seeker, with higher resolution and sensitivity, by Research Centre Imarat (RCI), that could track and distinguish targets at long distances. The first trials of the new seeker were carried out on 29 July 2013 in hot desert conditions in Rajasthan. The evaluation trials of the missile with the improved seeker were carried out in August and September 2013 and provided fairly accurate results. Performance trials were expected to begin in early 2014.

Nag scored a "bull's eye", successfully hitting a target 4 km away during a night trial in the Mahajan Field Firing Range, Rajasthan, in January 2016. During the test, the Thermal Target System (TTS) developed by a DRDO laboratory at Jodhpur was used as target for the missile. The TTS simulated a target similar to an operational tank by generating a thermal signature. The trial validated the enhanced 4-km range capability of the IIR seeker, which guides the missile to the target after its launch. The Nag cleared final developmental trials held by Indian Army in September 2016, making way once again for the weapon system to enter mass production. DRDO shared that the trials which concluded were successful for the extreme-heat daytime conditions of the desert.

On 8 September 2017, MoD announced that the DRDO had twice successfully flight-tested the missile against two different targets in two tests in the ranges of Rajasthan. The missile successfully hit both targets at different ranges and under different conditions with very high accuracy, as desired by the armed forces. With these two successful flight trials, and the flight test conducted earlier in peak of summer, the complete functionality of the Nag ATGM, along with the NAMICA launcher system, was established, marking the successful completion of development trials of the Nag missile. In 2017, however, the Army said that the developmental trials of Nag carried out earlier had only demonstrated partial success and that many more user trials would be needed. In 2017, the DRDO claimed that the Nag missile would be ready within four years.

The missile was again declared ready for induction on 28 February 2018, after a test in which two tanks destroyed in desert conditions. In 2018, the single-shot hit probability was 77% (later improved to 90%). In 2018, the DRDO chief claimed that the Nag system would be inducted into the Indian Army by 2019. On 7 July 2019, the DRDO carried out three successful trials of the Nag missile in the Pokhran firing range. The missiles were tested during both day and night. The missile was reportedly in the final stages of being inducted. The Nag missile was successfully tested 12 times between 7 and 18 July 2019. It was tested under extreme weather conditions during day and night, in indirect attack mode as well as in top attack mode, and achieved a direct hit on each target. These trials completed the summer user trials and the missile was expected to proceed towards induction into the Indian Army. The missile was expected to enter production by the end of 2019, according to a senior DRDO official.

On 22 October 2020, India successfully carried out the final trial of the Nag anti-tank guided missile from NAMICA, after which the weapon system is now ready for induction into the Indian Army.

Platforms 
As of 2017, the Nag missile's only operational launch platform is the purpose-built NAMICA missile carrier. A number of other variants were in various stages of development and testing.

NAMICA

The NAMICA (Nag Missile Carrier) is a stretched, license-built BMP-2 with additional wheels, nicknamed "Sarath" in India. It is classified as a tank destroyer. It is equipped with various electro-optical systems including a thermal imager (TI) and a laser rangefinder (LRF) for target acquisition. The NAMICA carries a total of twelve missiles, with eight in ready-to-fire mode and four in storage. It has a compact auxiliary power unit (APU) for silent watch operation, a fire detection and suppression system (FDSS) and nuclear, biological, and chemical protection system (NBCPS). The carrier weights 14.5 tonnes in full combat load and is capable of moving 7 km/h in water. The carrier was put through transportation trials, covering 155 km during 2008 summer trials. It has various modes of firing, including top attack and indirect attack mode. It has a lock-on-before-launch system, where the target is identified and designated before the launch. The range of attack is limited due to its targeting system being based on visual identification.

NAMICA can fire missiles at a target located around 7.5 kilometres with hunter-killer sight capability and carries 4 military personnel. The total project cost of NAMICA is ₹3000 crore and is developed by Defence Research and Development Laboratory (DRDL) and Ordnance Factory Board (OFB). Ministry of Defence (MoD) cleared NAMICA for production as of 14 August 2020.

Technical characteristics
 The Nag missile's exterior is made of fibreglass.

It is developed for engaging heavily armored tanks in all-weather conditions during day and night with a minimum range of 500m and a maximum range of 4km for the land variant. The third-generation fire-and-forget-class ATGM uses an imaging infrared (IIR) seeker that locks on to the target before launch. The airframe is made up of composite materials with high resistance to enemy countermeasures. The forward dome houses the guidance system. The middle portion of the body accommodates sensor packages and the warhead. A booster rocket is located towards the rear end. The Nag consists of four foldable wings and four tail fins that stabilize it during flight. A real-time image processor located next to the guidance package helps enable automatic target detection and tracking capability. The digital autopilot helps in the guidance, stability, and control after launch.

An electric actuation system also helps in flight control. The guidance system is based on an imaging infrared (IIR) seeker that ensures a high target accuracy in both top and front attack modes. A CCD camera integrated into the guidance system is useful as it is hard to jam. The initial guidance is provided by area correlation around the target, to which is added a centroid tracking mechanism. Homing in the terminal phase is done by area correlation around the centroid.

The Nag rises upwards suddenly and then bends at a steep angle to aim for the target.

Variants

MP-ATGM

The Man Portable Anti-tank Guided Missile (MP-ATGM) is an Indian-made third-generation anti-tank guided missile derived from the Nag missile.Recently DRDO confirmed its production to start in 2021.

HELINA, Dhruvastra

HELINA (Helicopter-launched Nag) is air-launched version of the Nag with extended range. It is launched from twin-tube stub wing-mounted launchers on board HAL Rudra helicopters and HAL Light Combat Helicopters (LCH) manufactured by Hindustan Aeronautics Limited (HAL). It is structurally different from Nag and is guided by an infrared imaging seeker (IIR) operating in a lock-on-before-launch mode for target engagement. The first ground launch of the missile to check lock-on after launch (LOAL) capability were conducted in 2011 during which the missile was locked onto a target and launched. While the missile was in flight, a second target was chosen for the missile to hit, which the missile destroyed. This demonstrated the capability of the missile to lock onto and hit a target while in mid-flight. In the ground-launched LOAL test, the missile was launched in the general direction of the target. On approaching the target, images of the area ahead were sent from the missile to the operator via a two-way, radio frequency, command-video data link. The operator identified the target in the images and updated the new target location into the seeker, after which the missile homed in on the target and destroyed it. It supports both top attack and direct attack functionality.

On 13 July 2015, three trials of HELINA were conducted by HAL at the Chandhan firing range in Jaisalmer, Rajasthan. The missiles were test-fired from a HAL Rudra; two missiles succeeded in hitting the targets at a range of 7 km, while one reportedly missed the target. After successful image capturing trials in Bangalore, DRDO planned to test HELINA with an updated 640x512-pixel resolution IIR seeker instead of the original 128x128-pixel resolution seeker in September 2016 for the Army Aviation Corps under hot desert conditions, with moving and static targets, for different range parameters.

On 19 August 2018, HELINA was successfully test-fired from a HAL LCH at the Pokhran test range. DRDO and the Indian Army tested HELINA with a range of 7–8km from the Integrated Test Range (ITR) in Chandipur, Odisha, on 8 February 2019 to check the maximum missile range and accuracy. The HELINA user trial was expected to be completed by 2020. The Indian armed forces successfully test fired the helicopter-launched Nag Missile (HELINA), now named Dhruvastra anti-tank guided missile in direct and top attack mode that is upgraded with new features. Three developmental flight trials were conducted from 15 to 16 July (2020) at ITR Balasore (Odisha) from a ground based launcher.

On 19 February 2021, Army variant HELINA and Air Force version Dhruvastra have successfully demonstrated their capabilities in a series of multi-mission user trials from HAL Rudra and is ready for induction into the Indian Armed Forces. HELINA completed all kind of user trials as of 20 September 2021. The Indian Army is ready for the missile acquisition which is expected to cost under ₹1 crore. The initial demand is of 500 missiles and 40 launching tubes.

On 12 April 2022, HELINA was test fired from Dhruv Helicopter platform in Pokhran.
HELINA has a range of 7 km which will put the enemy tank commanders in curved terrain at severe disadvantages. The missile weighs only 43 kg which will not cause any burden in limiting conditions of the rarefied atmosphere over Ladakh. In terms of firepower, HELINA can penetrate armour as thick as 800mm which is more than enough for penetrating the armor of the light and medium weight tanks operated in the frontier.

SANT

SANT or Standoff Anti-tank Guided Missile is a fourth generation upgraded variant of HELINA missile developed for long distance airborne anti-armour role. In November 2018, DRDO developed SANT was successfully tested at Pokhran range. The upgraded version of the missile is equipped with electro-optical thermal imager (EO/IR) and a new nose-mounted millimeter wave active radar homing (MMW) seeker with an extended range of up to 15 km to 20 km.

On 19 October 2020, SANT was again test fired by the DRDO at Chandipur test range. It is developed for the Indian Air Force and Army Aviation Corps with Lock-on after launch and Lock-on before launch capabilities.

On 11 December 2021, DRDO and IAF flight-tested SANT from Pokhran ranges. The release mechanism, guidance and tracking algorithms, avionics with integrated software performed well.

See also

 SAMHO (missile)

References

External links

 Annual Report 2018-19 Ministry of Defence, Government of India
 Nag ATGM
 Nag test video

Anti-tank guided missiles
Guided missiles of India
Weapons and ammunition introduced in 2020
Fire-and-forget weapons